Dubna is a town in Moscow Oblast, Russia. It has a status of naukograd (i.e. town of science), being home to the Joint Institute for Nuclear Research, an international nuclear physics research center and one of the largest scientific foundations in the country. It is also home to MKB Raduga, a defense aerospace company specializing in design and production of missile systems, as well as to the Russia's largest satellite communications center owned by Russian Satellite Communications Company.  The modern town was developed in the middle of the 20th century and town status was granted to it in 1956. Population:

Geography
The reservoir is formed by a hydroelectric dam across the Volga situated within the town borders. The town lies on both banks of the Volga. The western boundary of the town is defined by the Moscow Canal joining the Volga, while the eastern boundary is defined by the Dubna River joining the Volga.

Dubna is the northernmost town of Moscow Oblast.

History

Pre-World War II
Fortress Dubna belonging to Rostov-Suzdal Principality was built in the area in 1132 by the order of Yuri Dolgoruki and existed until 1216. The fortress was destroyed during the feudal war between the sons of Vsevolod the Big Nest. The village of Gorodishche was located on the right bank of the Volga River and was a part of the Kashin Principality. Dubna customs post ( was located in the area and was a part of the Principality of Tver.

Before the October Revolution, few villages were in the area: Podberezye was on the left bank of the Volga, and Gorodishche, Alexandrovka, Ivankovo, Yurkino, and Kozlaki were on the right bank.

Right after the Revolution one of the first collective farms was organized in Dubna area.

In 1931, the Orgburo of the Communist Party made a decision to build the Volga-Moscow Canal. Genrikh Yagoda, then the leader of the State Political Directorate, was put in charge of construction. The Canal was completed in 1937. Ivankovo Reservoir and Ivankovo hydroelectrical plant were also created as a part of the project. Many villages and the town Korcheva were submerged under water. Dubna is mentioned in Aleksandr Solzhenitsyn's book The Gulag Archipelago as the town built by Gulag prisoners.

Science

The decision to build a proton accelerator for nuclear research was taken by the Soviet government in 1946. An impractical place where the current town is situated was chosen due to remoteness from Moscow and the presence of the Ivankovo power plant nearby. The scientific leader was Igor Kurchatov. The general supervisor of the project including construction of a settlement, a road and a railway connecting it to Moscow (largely involving penal labour of Gulag inmates) was the NKVD chief Lavrentiy Beria. After three years of intensive work, the accelerator was commissioned on December 13, 1949.

The town of Dubna was officially inaugurated in 1956, together with the Joint Institute for Nuclear Research (JINR), which has developed into a large international research laboratory involved mainly in particle physics, heavy ion physics, synthesis of transuranium elements, and radiobiology. In 1960, a town of Ivankovo situated on the opposite (left) bank of the Volga was merged into Dubna. In 1964, Dubna hosted the prestigious International Conference on High Energy Physics.

Currently, a construction of NICA particle collider, a megascience project is underway in Dubna.

Outstanding physicists of the 20th century including Nikolay Bogolyubov, Georgy Flyorov, Vladimir Veksler, and Bruno Pontecorvo used to work at the institute. A number of elementary particles and nuclei of transuranium elements (most recently, element 117) have been discovered and investigated there, leading to the honorary naming of chemical element 105 dubnium (Db) for the town.

Administrative and municipal status
Within the framework of administrative divisions, it is incorporated as Dubna Town Under Oblast Jurisdiction—an administrative unit with the status equal to that of the districts. As a municipal division, Dubna Town Under Oblast Jurisdiction is incorporated as Dubna Urban Okrug.

Demographics

Economics
Before the dissolution of the Soviet Union, JINR and MKB Raduga were the main employers in the town. Since then their role has decreased significantly. Several small industrial enterprises have emerged, however the town still experiences some employment difficulties. Proximity to Moscow allows many to commute and work there. Plans by AFK Sistema and other investors including government structures have been announced to build a Russian analogue of Silicon Valley in Dubna. As of the beginning of 2007, nothing has commenced.

Transport

Dubna is starting point of the Moscow Canal. In addition to canal, Dubna is connected to moscow with А104 highway.Savyolovsky suburban railway line provide access to Moscow
The public transport connections to Moscow include express trains, suburban trains and bus shuttles which depart from the Savyolovsky Rail Terminal.

Culture

Since 2007 Dubna is a headquarters and primary location of international jazz festival MuzEnergo with free for public one-day open air festival in summer and one-week events in local venues in spring and autumn.

There are several museums in Dubna, including:
Museum of Archeology and Local History of Dubna
The JINR Museum of the History of Science and Technology
Museum of Natural History at Dubna International University
Museum of Locks

Sports

Dubna located on the Moscow Canal and Ivankovo Reservoir and hence it is a good destination for water transport such as windsurfing, kitesurfing, and water-skiing.. In 2004 Dubna hosted for the first time the stage of the World Cup in water skiing.In 2011,Water Ski World Championships was held in Dubna
Dubna's sports facilities include two stadiums, a waterski stadium on the Volga River, three swimming pools, tennis courts, and five sports complexes.

Trivia

The accompanying statue of Joseph Stalin of similar size was demolished in 1961 during the period of de-stalinization.

Gallery

Twin towns and sister cities

Dubna is twinned with:
 Giv'at Shmuel, Israel
 La Crosse, Wisconsin, United States
 Gołdap, Poland

References

Notes

Sources

External links

Official website of Dubna 
Dubna Business Directory 
News of Dubna  

Cities and towns in Moscow Oblast
Populated places established in 1956
Populated places on the Volga
Nuclear research institutes
Cities and towns built in the Soviet Union
Naukograds